The Genographic Project, launched on 13 April 2005 by the National Geographic Society and IBM, was a genetic anthropological study (sales discontinued on 31 May 2019) that aimed to map historical human migrations patterns by collecting and analyzing DNA samples. The final phase of the project was Geno 2.0 Next Generation. Upon retirement of the site, 1,006,542 participants in over 140 countries had joined the project.

Project history

Beginnings 
Created and led by project director Spencer Wells in 2005, the Genographic Project was a privately funded, not-for-profit collaboration between the National Geographic Society, IBM and the Waitt Foundation. Field researchers at eleven regional centers around the world began by collecting DNA samples from indigenous populations. Since the fall of 2015, the Project was led by Miguel Vilar.

In fall 2012, the Genographic Project announced the completion of a new genotyping array, dedicated to genetic anthropology, called GenoChip. GenoChip is specifically designed for anthropological testing and includes SNPs from autosomal DNA, X-chromosome DNA, Y-chromosome DNA and mitochondrial DNA (mtDNA). The design of the new chip was a collaborative effort between Wells of National Geographic, Eran Elhaik of Johns Hopkins, Family Tree DNA, and Illumina.

In the fall of 2015, a new chip was designed as a joint effort between Vilar, Genographic Lead Scientist, and Family Tree DNA.

In the spring of 2019, it was announced that the Geno project had ended but results would remain available online until 2020. In July 2020 the site was retired.

Geno 2.0 
The autosomal admixture analysis developed by Wells and Elhaik classifies individuals by assessing their proportions of genomic ancestry related to nine ancestral regions: East Asian, Mediterranean, Southern African, Southwest Asian, Oceanian, Southeast Asian, Northern European, Sub-Saharan African and Native American.

Geno 2.0 Next Generation 
In 2016, the project began utilizing cutting-edge Helix DNA sequencing for Geno 2.0 Next Generation, the current phase of the Genographic Project.  As compared to earlier phases which used nine regional affiliations, Geno 2.0 Next Generation analyzes modern-day indigenous populations around the world using either 18 or 22 regional affiliations. Utilizing a DNA-collection kit, Helix acquires a saliva sample from a participant, which is then analyzed for genomic identifiers that offer unprecedented insight into the person's genetic origins. The data is then uploaded to the Genographic Project DNA database.

Volunteer participation 

From 2005 to 2019 Genographic engaged volunteers (in fieldwork and providing DNA samples) and citizen science projects. During this time the National Geographic Society sold non-profit self-testing kits to members of the general public who wished to participate in the project as "citizen scientists". Such outreach for public participation in research has been encouraged by organizations such as International Society of Genetic Genealogy (ISOGG), which is seeking to promote benefits from scientific research. This includes supporting, organization and dissemination of personal DNA (genetic) testing.

The ISOGG supports citizen participation in genetic research, and believes such volunteers have provided valuable information and research to the professional scientific community.

In a 2013 speech to the Southern California Genealogical Society, Spencer Wells discussed its encouragement of citizen scientists. He said:
Since 2005, the Genographic Project has used the latest genetic technology to expand our knowledge of the human story, and its pioneering use of DNA testing to engage and involve the public in the research effort has helped to create a new breed of "citizen scientist." Geno 2.0 expands the scope for citizen science, harnessing the power of the crowd to discover new details of human population history.

Criticism 

Shortly after the announcement of the project in April 2005, the Indigenous Peoples Council on Biocolonialism (IPCB) noted its connections to controversial issues (such as concern among some tribes that the results of genetic human migration studies might indicate that Native Americans are not indigenous to North America). The IPCB recommended against indigenous people participating.

The founder of IPCB, Debra Harry, offered a rationale for why Indigenous people were discouraged to participate in the Genographic Project. According to Harry, a Northern Paiute Native American and Associate Professor in Indigenous Studies at Nevada University, the Genographic Project resulted in a human genetic testing practice that appeared to mask an ulterior motive rather than mere scientific research. Particularly, the great concern about the possible political interest behind the Genographic Project, motivated the IPCB to preemptively alert the global indigenous community on the “not so altruistic motivations” of the project. Additionally, IPCB argues that the Genographic project not only provides no direct benefit to Indigenous peoples but instead raises considerable risks. Such risks, raised by Harry in an interview released in December 2005, were used to advocate against the indigenous participation in the project. Another comment made by IPCB founder Debra Harry was that the Genographic Project served as a method to discredit kin relations through the possibility that ancestral identities may be invalidated and to deny Indigenous peoples’ access and authority over the resource-rich territories that they had for long inhabited. The IPCB also identified another attempt at biocolonialism in the Genographic Project. The latter involved the high probability of genetic testing results producing errors such as false negatives and positives that lead to the misidentification of Native people as non-Native and vice versa. Another negative consequence expressed by TallBear is the risk that an individual's cultural identity can be conclusively established through biocolonialist projects such as the Genographic Project. Ultimately, TallBear's argument is in close agreement with Harry's concerns regarding the Genographic Project and serves as a significant force motivating IPCB to advocate against Biocolonialism.

In May 2006, the project came to the attention of the United Nations Permanent Forum on Indigenous Issues (UNPFII). UNPFII conducted investigations into the objectives of the Genographic Project, and recommended that National Geographic and other sponsors suspend the project. Concerns were that the knowledge gleaned from the research could clash with long-held beliefs of indigenous peoples and threaten their cultures. There were also concerns that indigenous claims to land rights and other resources could be threatened.

, some federally recognized tribes in the United States declined to take part in the study including Maurice Foxx, chairman of the Massachusetts Commission on Indian Affairs and a member of the Mashpee Wampanoag.

See also

References

External links 
Official sites
 Genographic Project official site at National Geographic
 Arizona Research Laboratories (ARL)
 Waitt Family Foundation
News articles
 
 
 "Indigenous Peoples Oppose National Geographic", Indigenous Peoples Council on Biocolonialism, 13 April 2005.
 "Tracking the Truth", DB2 Magazine (IBM), information about IBM's role in the project. December 2006.
 Genographic Success Stories
 
 
Videos
 , on TED, 29 August 2008.

 
Human genome projects
Genographic
Citizen science
Crowdsourcing
American genealogy websites
Internet properties established in 2005
Internet properties disestablished in 2019
Internet properties disestablished in 2020
2005 establishments in the United States
2019 disestablishments in the United States